Grelen is a historic home located near Orange, Orange County, Virginia. The main house was built in 1935–1936, and consists of a -story, five bay, brick Georgian Revival style main block flanked by -story brick wings. The house is topped by a slate hipped roof and has a recessed centrally located six-panel front door surrounded by fluted pilasters. It features two massive interior brick chimneys with corbeled caps that rise above the roof of the main block of the house.

It was listed on the National Register of Historic Places in 1998.

References

Houses on the National Register of Historic Places in Virginia
Houses completed in 1936
Georgian Revival architecture in Virginia
Houses in Orange County, Virginia
National Register of Historic Places in Orange County, Virginia